Sue Myrick (née Wilkins; born August 1, 1941) is an American businesswoman and the former U.S. Representative for , serving from 1995 to 2013. She is a member of the Republican Party. She was the first Republican woman to represent North Carolina in Congress. On February 7, 2012, she announced that she was retiring. She left Congress in January 2013 and was succeeded by Robert Pittenger.

Myrick's son Dan Forest was the 34th Lieutenant Governor of North Carolina.

Early life, education, and business career
Myrick was born in 1941 in Tiffin, Ohio. She graduated from Port Clinton High School in Port Clinton, Ottawa County, Ohio. She attended Heidelberg University in Tiffin, Seneca County, Ohio between 1959 and 1960. Prior to going into public relations and advertising, she was a Sunday School Teacher. She is the former President and CEO of Myrick Advertising and Public Relations and Myrick Enterprises.

Charlotte city politics
Myrick ran for a seat on the Charlotte City Council unsuccessfully in 1981. In 1983, she was elected to an At-Large District of the City Council and served until 1985. In 1987, she was elected as the first female Mayor of Charlotte, North Carolina. In 1989, when Sue Myrick was running for re-election as mayor of Charlotte, NC, she confessed to having had a relationship with her husband in 1973 while he was still married to his former wife. (She went on to win the election.)

1992 U.S. Senate election

In 1992, she ran for the nomination for a U.S. Senate seat, held by incumbent Democratic U.S. Senator Terry Sanford. The Republican primary was won by Lauch Faircloth, who defeated Myrick and former U.S. Representative Walter Johnston 48%–30%–17%.

U.S. House of Representatives

Elections
In 1994, Myrick was elected to the House, succeeding five-term incumbent Alex McMillan.

Myrick was overwhelmingly elected to her sixth consecutive term in the 2004 Congressional elections, earning 70% of the popular vote and defeating Democrat Jack Flynn. Similarly, she defeated Democrat William Glass in 2006 with almost 67% of the vote.

Two Charlotte-area Democrats announced challenges to Myrick in 2008 – Harry Taylor and Ross Overby. Myrick defeated Taylor with almost 63% of the vote.

On February 7, 2012, she announced that she was retiring from Congress.

Tenure
Ideology
Myrick was one of the most conservative members of the House. She chaired the Republican Study Committee, a group of House conservatives, in the 108th Congress.

Being a cancer survivor herself, she has been one of the leading advocates to find a cure for breast cancer. While in Congress she introduced a bill to provide treatment for women on Medicaid diagnosed with breast cancer - the bill passed and was signed into law - previously women diagnosed under Medicaid had no treatment options.

Myrick was one of the leading Republican opponents of an abortive 2006 sale of operations at six major American ports along the East Coast to Dubai Ports World, a state-owned company from the United Arab Emirates.

Committee assignments
 Committee on Energy and Commerce (Vice Chair)
 Subcommittee on Health
 Subcommittee on Oversight and Investigations (Vice Chair - Full Committee)
 Permanent Select Committee on Intelligence (Chair of the Subcommittee on Terrorism, HUMINT, Analysis, and Counterintelligence)

Caucus memberships
 Deputy Whip
 Congressional Anti-Terrorism Caucus (Founder)
 House Cancer Caucus (Co-Chair)
 International Conservation Caucus
 Republican Study Committee (First woman chairman, 2003–2005)
 Sportsmen's Caucus
 Tea Party Caucus

Personal life
Sue is a wife and a mother of two children and three step-children. She and her husband, Ed Myrick, have 12 grandchildren and 7 great grandchildren. Her second son, Dan Forest, was elected Lieutenant Governor of North Carolina in 2012.

See also
 Women in the United States House of Representatives

References

External links

 
 
 Sue Myrick Mayoral Papers, J Murrey Atkins Library, UNC Charlotte
 Sue Myrick Congressional Papers, J Murrey Atkins Library, UNC Charlotte.

|-

|-

|-

1941 births
21st-century American politicians
Female members of the United States House of Representatives
Living people
Mayors of Charlotte, North Carolina
Charlotte, North Carolina City Council members
People from Tiffin, Ohio
Republican Party members of the United States House of Representatives from North Carolina
Women mayors of places in North Carolina
Tea Party movement activists
21st-century American women politicians
Women city councillors in North Carolina
Heidelberg University (Ohio) alumni
Members of Congress who became lobbyists